Jan-Erick Olsen (born 12 Otober 1965) is a Norwegian breaststroke swimmer. He was born in New York City. He competed at the 1984 Summer Olympics in Los Angeles and at the 1988 Summer Olympics in Seoul. He represented the club Odda IL.

References

External links
 

1965 births
Living people
Sportspeople from New York City
People from Odda
Norwegian male breaststroke swimmers
Olympic swimmers of Norway
Swimmers at the 1984 Summer Olympics
Swimmers at the 1988 Summer Olympics
20th-century Norwegian people